Scincella gemmingeri, commonly known as the forest ground skink, is a species of lizard in the family Scincidae. The species is endemic to Mexico.

Etymology
The specific name, gemmingeri, is in honor of German coleopterist Max Gemminger (1820–1887).

Geographic range
Scincella gemmingeri is found in the coastal regions of the Mexican state of Veracruz and various surrounding states.

Habitat
As its common name implies, the forest ground skink occurs primarily in forests, especially rainforests, oak forests, cloud forests, and tropical evergreen forests, although it is also sometimes found on pastureland.

Conservation status
Scincella gemmingeri is a common species and faces no major threats.

Reproduction
Scincella gemmingeri is oviparous.

Description
Like all members of the genus Scincella, S. gemmingeri is long and cylindrical, with short limbs. Its color is dark gray, and it has a dark stripe originating at the snout and running dorsolaterally along its body.

References

Perea-Pérez A., R. Peralta-Hernández and U.O. García-Vázquez. 2019. Reproduction: Scincella gemmingeri (Cope's Forest Ground Skink). Herpetological Review 50 (4): 791.

External links

Further reading
Cope ED (1864). "Contributions to the Herpetology of Tropical America". Proc. Acad. Nat. Sci. Philadelphia 16: 166-181. (Oligosoma gemmingeri, new species, p. 180).
García-Vásquez, Uri; Feria-Ortiz, Manuel (2006). "Skinks of Mexico". Reptilia (49): 74-79.

gemmingeri
Endemic reptiles of Mexico
Fauna of the Sierra Madre Oriental
Fauna of the Sierra Madre de Oaxaca
Reptiles described in 1864
Taxa named by Edward Drinker Cope